Ik Kudi Punjab Di is a 2010 Punjabi film directed by Manmohan Singh with story and screenplay by Singh and dialogues by Rana Ranbir. The film is produced by Singh and Ratan Bhatia and stars Amrinder Gill, Jaspinder Cheema, Aman Dhaliwal, Gugu Gill, Gurpreet Ghuggi, Rana Ranbir, and Kimi Verma.

Ik Kudi Punjab Di released on 17 September 2010 globally. It was keenly awaited due to its theme, lead actor Amrinder Gill and the director. The director/writer/producer has attempted a very new and unique concept of drama/theatre in Ik Kudi Punjab Di which is not done much in Punjabi cinema.

Plot
Ik Kudi Punjab Di tells a richly textured tale from a keenly female perspective set against the backdrop of male-dominated Punjabi society. It does so with a Shakespearean credo of "all the world’s a stage" and a lively cast.

SP Singh (Amrinder Gill) is a boy from a wealthy family who meets Navdeep (Jaspinder Cheema), the girl of his dreams, at his college drama class. They quickly bond, much to the chagrin of bad-boy student Vicky (Aman Dhaliwal) who prizes Navdeep for himself.

The male-chauvinist Vicky has no chance with the progressive-minded Navdeep. Even Singh, the man who she admires enough to call a friend, is in for a shock. Navdeep doesn't want to get married; she's intent on being the guardian of her loving parents because the family lacks a male heir.

Singh tests his own view of women by agreeing to all of Navdeep's demands, including becoming a ghar jamai. This is seen as both revolutionary (by her classmates) and an affront to Punjabi society and tradition.

Cast
 Amrinder Gill as SP (Sehajpal) Singh
 Jaspinder Cheema as Navdeep Sidhu
 Surbhi Jyoti as Gurmeet Kaur
 Gugu Gill as Professor Gill
 Gurpreet Ghuggi as Bawa/Laali Baba
 Rana Ranbir
 Kanwaljit Singh as Sehajpal's Father
 Deep Dhillon as Sukhdev Singh
 Navneet Nishan
 Kimi Verma as Laali
 Aman Dhaliwal as Param Dhillon 
 Neeta Mahindra
 Balwinder Begowal
 Tarshinder Soni
 Sukhbir Razia
 Surinder Sharma
 Niyamat Kaur as Roshni
 Karamjit Brar as Haryanvi Boy

Music

The music of Ik Kudi Punjab Di was praised by audiences and critics alike. Singh Speaks particularly praised it by calling this album very good. Punjabi Portal also praised the album saying that the great music further increases the expectation from the film.

The album was released on Speed Records in India and Moviebox in the UK. The UK album artwork featured the stars of the film, Amrinder Gill and Jaspinder Cheema, instead of the support characters pictured on the Indian cover artwork.

In October 2010, Amrinder Gill scored a Top 30 hit in the UK on the official Asian Download Chart with the lead track from the film, "Sochan Vich."

References

External links
 

Punjabi-language Indian films
2010s Punjabi-language films